Colin Clish (born 14 January 1944) is a former footballer who played as a left back for Newcastle United, Rotherham United and Doncaster Rovers.

As well as playing football, Clish was a cricketer, playing as a batsman for Durham Colts and Durham County Juniors in 1961 and 1962.

Before his senior career, he played for Chester-le-Street Schools and Durham County Schools under 15s in 1957–59 alongside Alan Suddick and Norman Hunter.

Senior club career

Newcastle United
He started his football career playing for Newcastle United in the English Second Division, his debut was at left back in a 2–2 draw at Sheffield United in the League Cup on 2 October 1961.

Clish captained the club's Youth Cup winning team in 1962. During his time at the club he played in 23 League and Cup matches.

Rotherham United
Clish signed for fellow 2nd Division side Rotherham United in December 1963, for £5,000.

Doncaster Rovers
As part of a deal including several players swapping teams, he moved to English Division 4 club Doncaster Rovers in February 1968. His debut was in a 2–0 home victory against Brentford on 10 February 1968. In that April he scored both goals in a 2–2 draw with Bradford City.

The following year he played a significant part in Doncaster's title winning season as they gained promotion to Division 3. In August 1969 he broke his leg in a game at Shrewsbury Town which put him out till that December. He was never quite the same player after this.

After a total of 111 League and Cup appearances, and 4 goals, Doncaster released Clish at the end of the 1971–72 season, with him going on to play for Gainsborough Trinity for a while.

Honours
Newcastle United
FA Youth Cup winner 1962
Doncaster Rovers
English Division 4 winner 1968–69

Personal life
Following football, Clish worked for British Transport Police being based at Doncaster Station, retiring in 2003.

References

1944 births
Living people
People from Hetton-le-Hole
Footballers from Tyne and Wear
English footballers
English Football League players
Association football fullbacks
Newcastle United F.C. players
Rotherham United F.C. players
Doncaster Rovers F.C. players
Gainsborough Trinity F.C. players